Jangan may refer to:
 Chang'an, China
 Jan Gan (disambiguation), places in Iran